Goat Lake may refer to:
Goat Lake (Sawtooth Wilderness), a glacial lake in Custer County, Idaho
Goat Lake (Glacier County, Montana)
Goat Lake (Snohomish County, Washington)

See also
Goat Haunt Lake, a lake in Glacier National Park, Montana
Goat Rock Lake, a reservoir on the Chattahoochee River